Jason Tengco is a Filipino-American political strategist, he currently serves at the Office of Personnel Management as a White House liaison under the administration of President Joe Biden.

References 

United States Office of Personnel Management